"Leaving Home" is a song by Australian alternative rock band Jebediah, released in April 1997 as the lead single from their debut studio album, Slightly Odway.  It was written by band members Chris Daymond, Kevin Mitchell, Vanessa Thornton and Brett Mitchell. It peaked at number 48 on the ARIA Singles Chart and reached number 10 in the Triple J Hottest 100 music poll for 1997.

Reception 
Australian musicologist Ian McFarlane described "Jerks of Attention" and "Leaving Home" as "two cracking singles".

Jonathan Lewis of AllMusic reviewed Slightly Odway, and he wrote: "Opening with the song that really launched their career, 'Leaving Home', the band sets the scene for what is to come. Loud guitars, cartoonishly simple lyrics, and a chorus that would send even the tamest of mosh-pits into a frenzy. And all of it topped by Kevin Mitchell's bizarre singing style – a mess of twisted vowels and the same sort of pronunciation that had James Reyne's fans reaching for their lyric sheets in confusion."

Music video
The music video featured the band playing on the front lawn of a suburban home.

Limited-edition vinyl release
It was later released as a limited-edition vinyl, with only 250 made for a Perth, Australia, release.

Track listing

Charts

References

1997 singles
Jebediah songs
1997 songs
Songs written by Kevin Mitchell (musician)
Murmur (record label) singles